Natalia Vladimirovna Khoreva (born 28 May 1986) is a Russian luger who has competed since 1999. She finished 16th in the 2008-09 Luge World Cup.

Khoreva's best finish at the FIL World Luge Championships was 24th in the women's singles event at Oberhof in 2008. Her best finish at the FIL European Luge Championships was tenth in the women's singles event at Sigulda in 2010.

Khoreva qualified for the 2010 Winter Olympics where she finished tenth in the women's singles event.

References

External links
 

1986 births
Living people
Russian female lugers
Olympic lugers of Russia
Lugers at the 2010 Winter Olympics
Lugers at the 2014 Winter Olympics